Abdul Razak (born 11 November 1992) is an Ivorian footballer who plays as a midfielder.

He began his career with Manchester City, making ten appearances and winning the FA Community Shield in 2012. After leaving in 2013, he had numerous short spells with clubs in Russia, England, Greece and Sweden.

Razak earned five caps for the Ivory Coast national team from 2012 to 2013, and played at the 2013 Africa Cup of Nations.

Club career

Manchester City
Having left Crystal Palace's youth set-up in 2008,
Razak joined the Manchester City Elite Development Squad in July 2010. However, he was not chosen to play his first game for the EDS until 3 February 2011 when he was one of the starting eleven in the EDS team that beat the Bury reserve team 2–0 at Ewen Fields in the Manchester Senior Cup.
Only two days later, Razak was then given a surprise debut for the first team, coming on as a substitute for David Silva in the final minutes of the Premier League game against West Bromwich Albion on 5 February 2011, a 3–0 win at the City of Manchester Stadium.
His unexpected first team debut makes Razak the ninth youth player to graduate from Manchester City's academy under manager Roberto Mancini in just over a year of the latter's management at the club. The day after his debut for the Manchester City first team Razak was added to the first team squad. In his second game for the EDS team three days later the young Ivorian was shown a straight red card for a rash challenge in the 51st minute of the Premier Reserve League North game against Bolton Wanderers.

He made his first start on 21 September 2011 in the third round of the Football League Cup against Birmingham City, playing for 86 minutes before being substituted for Luca Scapuzzi. He ended that season with one league appearance as Manchester City won the 2011–12 Premier League in dramatic circumstances on the last day of the season.

On 28 October 2011, Razak was loaned to Championship club Portsmouth on a one-month deal.
He made his debut against Derby County the next day, coming on as a 62nd-minute substitute in a game Portsmouth lost 3–1.
After one month with Pompey and three appearances, Razak returned to Manchester City.

On 17 February 2012, Razak, along with fellow City youngster Gai Assulin joined Championship side Brighton & Hove Albion on a three-month loan deal.

On 12 August 2012, Razak was an unused substitute as City won the 2012 FA Community Shield 3–2 against Chelsea at Villa Park.

On 29 September 2012, Razak joined a third Championship club, Charlton Athletic, on a three-month loan deal. After one month, he returned to Manchester City having made only two first team appearances.

Later career
On 2 September 2013, Razak joined Russian club Anzhi Makhachkala on a season-long loan deal, with a trigger clause that once he made an appearance for Anzhi the transfer becomes a permanent one. On 17 October, the clause was activated.

On 30 January 2014, Razak returned to the Premier League, when he joined West Ham United on a short-term contract. In April that year, he left the club without having played a first team game.

Razak played for OFI Crete F.C. in Super League Greece before coming back to England to train with Doncaster Rovers. On 10 February 2015, he signed for Rovers for the rest of the League One season.

In January 2017, Razak transferred from AFC Eskilstuna to IFK Göteborg on a three-year deal. After only five appearances and a loan back to AFC, in February 2018 he left for another Swedish team, IK Sirius Fotboll. In February 2020, he signed for Örgryte IS, IFK's rivals.

International career
Razak made his début for the Ivory Coast national football team against Russia in a friendly match in August 2012. He was included in the Ivory Coast squad for the 2013 Africa Cup of Nations and was in Les Éléphants starting line-up for their third group match against Algeria.

Career statistics

Club

International

Honours
Manchester City
 FA Community Shield: 2012

References

External links

 
 
 

1992 births
Living people
Ivorian footballers
Association football midfielders
Manchester City F.C. players
Portsmouth F.C. players
Brighton & Hove Albion F.C. players
Charlton Athletic F.C. players
FC Anzhi Makhachkala players
West Ham United F.C. players
OFI Crete F.C. players
Doncaster Rovers F.C. players
AFC Eskilstuna players
IFK Göteborg players
IK Sirius Fotboll players
Örgryte IS players
Premier League players
English Football League players
Russian Premier League players
Super League Greece players
Allsvenskan players
Superettan players
Ivory Coast international footballers
2013 Africa Cup of Nations players
Ivorian expatriate footballers
Expatriate footballers in England
Expatriate footballers in Russia
Expatriate footballers in Sweden
Ivorian expatriate sportspeople in England
Ivorian expatriate sportspeople in Russia
Ivorian expatriate sportspeople in Sweden
People from Bouaké